George Stott (born 1906) was an English professional footballer who played as an outside right.

Career
Born in North Shields, Stott spent his early career with Percy Main Colliery, Chilton Colliery Recreation Athletic, Barnsley, Monckton Athletic, Bedlington United and Rochdale. He signed for Bradford City from Rochdale in July 1931, making 5 league appearances for the club, before moving to Hull City in May 1932. At Hull he made a further 4 league appearances in 1932 before being released. He later played for Macclesfield and Frickley Colliery.

Sources

References

1906 births
Date of death missing
English footballers
Chilton Colliery Recreation F.C. players
Barnsley F.C. players
Monckton Athletic F.C. players
Bedlington United A.F.C. players
Rochdale A.F.C. players
Bradford City A.F.C. players
Hull City A.F.C. players
Macclesfield Town F.C. players
Frickley Athletic F.C. players
English Football League players
Association football outside forwards